Venelles is a commune in the Bouches-du-Rhône department in southern France near Aix-en-Provence. The current mayor is Arnaud Mercier.

History
In 15 BC, there was a Roman settlement there. It was then destroyed by the Lombards in 574 AD, and again in the 11th century by the Saracens.

In the 15th century, the land was finally re-settled.

In 1530 there were seven houses, by 1728 there were 30, in 1765 there were 124 and in 1820 there were 211.

In 1865 a railway was built, followed by a school in 1882.

On 11 June 1909, an earthquake destroyed many houses.

Population

See also
Communes of the Bouches-du-Rhône department

References

Citations

External links 

 Official website

Communes of Bouches-du-Rhône
Bouches-du-Rhône communes articles needing translation from French Wikipedia